An undue hardship is an American legal term referring to special or specified circumstances that partially or fully exempt a person or organization from performance of a legal obligation so as to avoid an unreasonable or disproportionate burden or obstacle.

For example, employers are required to provide a reasonable accommodation to qualified individuals with disabilities, but when an accommodation becomes too taxing on the organization it is classified as an undue hardship and is no longer required.  
These hardships include the nature and cost of the accommodation in relation to the size, resources, nature, and structure of the employer's operation. In the religious exemption context, undue burden is separately defined as anything "more than de minimus", as opposed to onerous or costly burdens.

See also   
 Central Alberta Dairy Pool v. Alberta (Human Rights Commission)   
 Central Okanagan School District No. 23 v. Renaud   
 British Columbia (PSERC) v. BCGSEU   
 Carnival Cruise Lines, Inc. v. Shute   
 Groff v. Dejoy   
 British Columbia (Superintendent of Motor Vehicles) v. British Columbia (Council of Human Rights)   
 Work-product doctrine   
 Constructive trust   
 Employment discrimination law in the United States   
 Section 508 Amendment to the Rehabilitation Act of 1973   
 Forum non conveniens   
 Chapter 7, Title 11, United States Code 
 Hardship clause

References

 
Anti-discrimination law
Labour law
Legal doctrines and principles